Robots is an anthology of science fiction short stories edited by Isaac Asimov, Martin H. Greenberg and Charles G. Waugh as the ninth volume in their Isaac Asimov's Wonderful Worlds of Science Fiction series. It was first published in paperback by Signet/New American Library in April 1989. The first British edition was issued in paperback by Robinson in 1989.

The book collects seventeen novelettes and short stories by various science fiction authors, together with an introduction by Asimov.

Contents
"Introduction: Robots" (Isaac Asimov)
"The Tunnel Under the World" (Frederik Pohl)
"Brother Robot" (Henry Slesar)
"The Lifeboat Mutiny" (Robert Sheckley)
"The Warm Space" (David Brin)
"How-2" (Clifford D. Simak)
"Too Robot to Marry" (George H. Smith)
"The Education of Tigress McCardle" (C. M. Kornbluth)
"Sally" (Isaac Asimov)
"Breakfast of Champions" (Thomas A. Easton)
"Sun Up" (A. A. Jackson, IV and Howard Waldrop)
"Second Variety" (Philip K. Dick)
"The Problem Was Lubrication" (David R. Bunch)
"First to Serve" (Algis Budrys)
"Two-Handed Engine" (C. L. Moore and Henry Kuttner)
"Though Dreamers Die" (Lester del Rey)
"Soldier Boy" (Michael Shaara)
"Farewell to the Master" (Harry Bates)

Notes

1989 anthologies
Science fiction anthologies
Martin H. Greenberg anthologies
Isaac Asimov anthologies
Robots in literature
Signet Books books